Jeff Coetzee and Chris Haggard were the defending champions but lost in the first round to Jiří Novák and Petr Pála.

Justin Gimelstob and Nicolas Kiefer won in the final 6–7(6–8), 6–3, 7–6(7–4) against Scott Humphries and Mark Merklein.

Seeds

Draw

External links
 2003 AIG Japan Open Tennis Championships Men's Doubles Draw

Doubles